Achaea trapezoides is a species of moth of the family Erebidae. It is found in South Africa and on Réunion.

Achille Guenée described this species with a wingspan of 52 mm.

Their caterpillars feed on Euphorbiaceae,  Acalpha species and Ricinus communis. They have also been observed on roses

References

Achaea (moth)
Moths of Madagascar
Moths of Mauritius
Moths of Réunion
Erebid moths of Africa
Moths described in 1862